Attorney General Ross may refer to:

Joseph J. Ross (1841–1900), Attorney General of Liberia
Samuel Alfred Ross (1870–1929), Attorney General of Liberia

See also
General Ross (disambiguation)